Men's Kabaddi at the 2018 Asian Games was held in Garuda Theatre, Taman Mini Indonesia Indah, Jakarta, Indonesia from 19 to 24 August 2018.

Squads

Results
All times are Western Indonesia Time (UTC+07:00)

Preliminary round

Group A

Group B

Knockout round

Semifinals

Gold medal match

Final standing

References

Results

Kabaddi at the 2018 Asian Games